Michael Timothy Tonis (born February 9, 1979) is a Greek-American former professional baseball catcher. He played in Major League Baseball (MLB) for the Kansas City Royals.

Career
Tonis attended Elk Grove High School and was drafted in the 52nd round of the  Major League Baseball draft by the New York Mets, but did not sign, instead choosing to attend the University of California. In 1998, he played collegiate summer baseball with the Brewster Whitecaps of the Cape Cod Baseball League and was named a league all-star. The Royals drafted him again in the 2nd round of the  draft and he did sign. Prior to the 2002 season, Tonis suffered multiple injuries, which sidelined him for most of the season. When he returned, he was hit in the jaw with a pitch while rehabbing, and was forced to have his jaw wired shut. He played his last game on June 24 before being sent back down to Double-A. He has not played for an MLB affiliated team since.

Tonis joined the Greek baseball team for the 2004 Athens Olympics. Mike played for Greece and used his complete Greek name which is Michael Koutsantonakis. As was the case with many Greek immigrants to America, Mike's grandfather abbreviated his original Greek last name to an easier to pronounce and spell "Americanized" name.

After the Athens 2004 Olympics, Mike continued to be an active roster player for the Greek National Baseball Team.  He played for Greece in the 2008 European Qualifier Cup in Abrandes, Portugal; in the 2010 European Seniors Championship in Stuttgart, Germany; and in the 2011 IBAF Baseball World Cup in Panama.

References

External links

KFFL
Remembering Mike Tonis - Royals Review

1979 births
Living people
American people of Greek descent
Baseball players from Sacramento, California
Major League Baseball catchers
Kansas City Royals players
California Golden Bears baseball players
Baseball players at the 2004 Summer Olympics
Olympic baseball players of Greece
Greek baseball players
Omaha Golden Spikes players
Wilmington Blue Rocks players
Charleston AlleyCats players
Wichita Wranglers players
Peoria Javelinas players
Gulf Coast Royals players
Brewster Whitecaps players